Westover is a neighborhood in Arlington, Virginia on the National Register of Historic Places centered on Washington Boulevard between North McKinley Road and North Longfellow Street.  A true model of mid-century Urbanism, Westover remains a pedestrian friendly neighborhood which sees its residents walk to shops, work, and public transportation.  The neighborhood is between the Ballston Station and the East Falls Church Stations, both part of the Washington DC Metro and is serviced by many Metro Buses.

History
During the nineteenth and early twentieth centuries, the area that was to become Westover was agricultural in nature, not unlike much of what is now Arlington County at the time. In the mid-nineteenth century, the property was owned by Nicholas Febrey, a civic leader in Arlington and one of the largest landholders in the area.

In the 1890s, small communities began to develop along newly established electric railways which serviced the area, as real estate developers began subdividing the land.  One such community was Fostoria, developed by the Fostoria Land and Development Company in 1890, which took advantage of the Washington, Arlington, and Falls Church Electric Railway.  The railroad provided passenger service from Rosslyn to East Falls Church and ran along Four Mile Run.  By 1907, the neighborhood was known as Highland Park - the earliest houses constructed in the Westover area are located within this community.

A measure of the development in the area at the time, the Walter Reed Elementary School was constructed in 1938 on McKinley Road, originally a section of Febrey farmland.  Though Westover had seen significant development over the previous half century, in 1938, when the school was constructed, the area was still largely undeveloped.  By that time, most of Westover was owned primarily by Ashton C. Jones and his wife, Margaret Rucker.  Jones deeded the land to the local development company, Mace Properties, Inc., which was owned by Miles A. Mace.  In turn, Mace Properties developed the majority of the buildings located in what is now the Westover Historic District between 1939 and 1948.

Following the principles set forth by the FHA and responding to the need for affordable housing, Mace developed several neighborhoods in Arlington County in the early twentieth century which provided economical housing to the growing population. Mace, who lived in Arlington County, was a real estate broker.  He was just twenty-six years old when he began to play a role in developing the community of Over-Lee Knolls—adjacent to Westover to the northwest and today considered part of greater Westover.  The Over-Lee Knolls neighborhood was advertised in 1926 as "Virginia's Ideal Suburb" which emphasized value and quality construction.

In April 1939, Mace Properties announced that it had received FHA approval for low-cost multi-family rental housing. The first of these constructed was a 152 unit garden-style apartment building which cost Mace a total cost of $600,000 to build. In 1940, the FHA-backed Westover Hills project was announced. Westover Hills was hailed as the "most ambitious building program in Mace Properties' [sic] history." The dwellings, including single-family houses, twin houses, and garden apartments, were designed by Thelander and Washington, D.C. architect Harry E. Ormston.

During 1940, the Westover Shopping Center was constructed—a 13-store retail center along Washington Boulevard between Longfellow and McKinley Streets.  The shopping center initially included a Safeway grocery store, a "five and dime" store, and a pharmacy.  In 1958, county planners noted that the center's "retail sales per store [were] higher... than in any of the five nearby competing neighborhood or community centers. "  However, by the late seventies, the center's physical condition and sales had declined.  In 1978, the Arlington County Board allocated $50,000 in business and neighborhood conservation funds to supplement $250,000 worth of exterior renovation work planned by the center's owners.

Today, Westover is a residential suburban community and its overall character remains predominately unchanged.  The shopping center continues to provide a mix of retail offerings to the community.  Residences in the neighborhood are still composed mostly of modest, pre-World War II single family homes and garden style apartment complexes such as the Westover Apartments.  Like those in most older suburban neighborhoods, the dwellings in Westover have been adapted to fit modern-day needs and growing families.  In many instances, porches have been enclosed and/or enlarged for additional bathrooms.

Transit

Westover has access to many modes of transportation, both public and private.  Approximately 22% of people within Westover's Zip Code (22205) use transit other than a private vehicle to get to work

The central artery in Westover is Washington Boulevard which serves as a commercial focal point as well as a regional connector.

Westover is situated between exits 69 and 71 on Interstate 66.

Also close by is the East Falls Church Metro Station, part of the Washington DC Metro's Silver Line and Orange Line.  The community is served by MetroBus, via the 2A, 2B, 2C, and 2G lines which run down Washington Boulevard.  The Art Bus line 52, an Arlington-provided bus system, also passes through the community, though it does not travel through what many consider to be central Westover - Washington Boulevard between North Mckinley and Longfellow Streets.

The Washington & Old Dominion Railroad and Custis multi use trails also pass through Southern Westover, connecting the community to Falls Church to the West and The Rosslyn-Ballston corridor and Washington, D.C. to the East.

Buildings

The Reed School

Westover is home to the Walter Reed School, built in 1938 and reopened in October 2009 after significant renovations. It currently serves as a pre-school and public library, having served as an elementary school from 1938 to 1984.

The Walter Reed Elementary School was built in 1938 by contractor T. Calvin Owens on what was farmland at the time.  In 1950, the school was expanded and altered.  A new 8 classroom wing and mechanical room were added to the rear of the building, while lower level rooms were converted to a library, teachers room, clinic and conference room.  To cope with further population growth, in 1966 an octagonal classroom building was constructed.

By  the 1980s the Reed School building was deemed unsuitable for use as an elementary school according to modern standards. It contained large amounts of asbestos and lead paint, was extremely difficult to heat and cool, and was plagued by problems with mold and excessive humidity. It also was not wheelchair-accessible. Due to the physical problems in the building, declining enrollment, and the view of then-school superintendent Charles M. Nunley, the school ceased functioning as a traditional educational facility in 1984.  Because other schools were not walking-distance from Westover,  A County-funded study at the time predicted that, within 20 years, Reed would be needed to meet the needs of the projected population.

On May 9, 2008, a Groundbreaking Ceremony was held at the Reed School site for the $21.6M Reed School/Westover Library project.  The project included tearing down the entire building, with the exception of the original 1938 shell, and rebuilding into a  building which houses the new Westover Branch Library and several public pre-school programs. The library reopened on October 31, 2009, having been relocated from its former location approximately one block northeast.

By 2010, as predicted, the elementary schools that had absorbed Reed's student population (McKinley and Tuckahoe elementary schools) were the most overcrowded in the county, and the county considered expanding Reed to serve as an elementary school again. Due to neighborhood objections and recent construction at the site, a location on the campus of Williamsburg Middle School was chosen instead (Discovery Elementary, which opened in 2015). In 2014, the Reed building was also considered as a new location for the H-B Woodlawn Secondary Program. After neighborhood objection, citing the proximity of another secondary school (Swanson, below) and a new-found desire for a neighborhood elementary school, the district chose another location for H-B Woodlawn.

By the fall of 2017 the Arlington School Board had approved construction at the Reed site of a new neighborhood elementary school.  The conceptual design for the new school will be approved by the School Board in the spring.  The new school is scheduled to open in the fall of 2021.

Cardinal Elementary School 
The newly renovated and expanded Reed Building is now host to the new Cardinal Elementary School, which started accepting students in the fall of 2021. Cardinal Elementary School has absorbed most former McKinley Elementary students, as their building now hosts Arlington Traditional School. In addition, Cardinal accepted some Tuckahoe students, since Tuckahoe is overcrowded. Cardinal Elementary School is named as such to make McKinley students, whose mascot was the cardinal, feel better at Cardinal. Cardinal ES currently has 683 students enrolled.

Swanson Middle School

Swanson Middle School is located at the intersection of Patrick Henry Drive and Washington Boulevard in Westover.  Built in 1939, Swanson is part of the Arlington Historic District and is the oldest operating junior high in Arlington. Originally a 7-9th grade school, it currently serves 6-8th grade students.

Swanson Junior High School, built by contractor E. A. Pessagnolo for a cost of $200,941, opened in 1939 on land formerly occupied by the A. Duke Torreyson family farm.  In 1955, a large addition off the North side was constructed to add classroom space.  In 1963 and 1968, the central courtyard of the original design was filled in via two additions which accommodated a gymnasium, classrooms, a library, and mechanical rooms.

In 1958, Swanson was the focus of a racial desegregation controversy when it came under court order to admit an African American student.  The student was "one of seven [plaintiffs] who can attempt to enter white schools under a court order."  State officials threatened to shut the school down in the fall to avoid the desegregation.  Ultimately, integration did not actually take place until 1959, when several African American students were admitted to Stratford Junior High School.

Commerce
Westover Village, as it is sometimes called, is home to many Arlington institutions:

The Lost Dog Cafe, is a pizza and sandwich shop which was established in 1985.  Originally a specialty grocery and carry out place called Gourmet Pizza Deli with limited seating, the owners took over adjacent space in the late 1990s and opened a sit down restaurant.  It expanded again in 2009.  The Lost Dog Cafe is also affiliated with the Lost Dog and Cat Rescue Foundation which was established in 2001. The Lost Dog and Cat Rescue Foundation places an average of 1500 animals annually into permanent homes. It also has another restaurant in the same block called Stray Cat Cafe, which sports a sign on the wall promising "Same Day Service Guaranteed."

Lebanese Taverna, the original restaurant in the now regionally-popular chain calls Westover home.

The Westover Farmers Market was established by local residents on the Reed school property adjacent to N. McKinley Road.  The market opened in the spring of 2012 with a dozen vendors, primarily farmers.  By 2017 this Sunday market, owned and managed by Field to Table, Inc., a Virginia nonprofit corporation, had grown to 30 vendors in the summertime and 25 vendors in the wintertime.  The farmers market enables hundreds of families in the west end of Arlington to purchase locally grown seasonal fruits and vegetables year round, as well as a wide range of locally produced foods such as breads, pickles, home canned items, and many ready-to-eat items.  The market enhances the already strong sense of community found in the Westover area.

Westover Shopping Center
The Westover Shopping Center along Washington Boulevard is anchored on the Western end by the Preston King Post Office.  Moving Eastward is small a family-owned and run grocery store, Westover Market.  Westover Market's "Great Wall of Beer" is known throughout the Washington Metropolitan area for its selection of over 550 varieties of beer.

J.W.Ayers Variety & Hardware is a family-owned and operated independent hardware, housewares and notions store which opened in 1947.  It specializes in keeping in stock items needed in the maintenance of older homes in the area.  Further East is Toby's Homemade Ice Cream & Coffee, an ice cream and coffee shop featuring ice cream made on the premises, locally roasted gourmet coffee and a well-used community bulletin board.  The Toby's location housed the Westover Bakery for many years, before closing down in the early 1990s.  Pete's Barber Shop opened next door in 1968, where Pete Xereas could be seen cutting hair daily through the shop window until his retirement in 2014—the shop remains open under new ownership.

Also located in the center is the Forest Inn Bar and Restaurant, a chain pharmacy, and the 2nd location of The Italian Store, a popular Arlington mainstay.

External links
In Arlington’s Westover Village, residents’ favorite haunts are a short walk away

References

Neighborhoods in Arlington County, Virginia
National Register of Historic Places in Arlington County, Virginia